Antonio Lopez-Fitzgerald is a fictional character on the NBC/DirecTV soap opera Passions. Antonio is played by Christopher Douglas from October 1, 2001, to June 24, 2004. After a four-year absence, Douglas returned on July 23, 2008.

Storylines
Antonio is the eldest child of Pilar Lopez-Fitzgerald and Martin Fitzgerald. Years after Martin disappeared, Antonio also disappeared. Pilar lit candles in honor of both men for many years, and their disappearances led to Luis Lopez-Fitzgerald's lifelong fear that he would someday also be driven to abandon his family. It was eventually revealed that Julian Crane drove Antonio to flee town, but the reason was not explained.

Antonio first appeared on the show under the pseudonym Brian O'Leary (his middle name and his paternal grandmother's maiden name). He was a fisherman living on St. Lisa, a fictional island near Bermuda. After Sheridan Crane was caught in a boat explosion with her fiancé Luis, she washed up on St. Lisa and Brian found her. Sheridan had amnesia and took the name Diana. She and Brian began a relationship. He was good friends with his ex-girlfriend Liz, who owned a hotel on St. Lisa; she still loved him, but he had always felt unable to commit to her. Eventually Antonio's past as a con man came back to haunt him, as he and Diana were almost killed by Antonio's former boss Nick Bozman.

Brian returned to Harmony, resuming his original identity as Antonio (which had already been revealed to the audience) and reuniting with his family. Diana regained her memory as Sheridan after encountering Luis; subsequently, Antonio developed a terminal illness, with symptoms including temporary blindness, and everyone in Harmony conspired to prevent him from learning about Sheridan's past with Luis, for fear that the shock would kill him. Antonio and Sheridan married, but Sheridan also carried on an affair with Luis. Sheridan gave birth to a son, Marty, who was believed (but never confirmed) to be Luis'. However, Beth Wallace abducted the child and passed him off as her own, leaving Sheridan to believe her own baby had died. Antonio learned the truth about Sheridan's relationship with Luis. Sheridan's evil father Alistair Crane manipulated Antonio into putting Sheridan into a mental hospital due to her apparent fixation on "Beth's" child. Sheridan left Antonio for Luis, and Antonio was presumed dead in an explosion caused by a bomb that Alistair had planted to kill Sheridan, who escaped. 
 
Four years later, Antonio reappeared in Harmony on the day that his siblings Luis, Miguel, and Paloma were all getting married. Alistair had faked Antonio's death and had actually been holding him prisoner in Boston. After Alistair's murder months earlier, the guards' salaries were discontinued and they abandoned their post, enabling him to escape. Antonio asked Sheridan to consider building a life with him, as the records of their past lives suggested that they always end up together, and that her efforts to be with Luis could lead to his death as it did in his past lives. She agreed to give their relationship another try. Antonio was reunited with his family, shortly after Pilar had lamented that her joy over her children's marriages was incomplete due to the absence of her firstborn.

When Luis was on death row, he and Pilar were comforted by what seemed to be Antonio's ghost; this incident is unexplained as Antonio was later revealed to have been alive and imprisoned elsewhere at that time.

See also
 Lopez-Fitzgerald family
 Crane family

External links
soapcentral.com|PS Online
Antonio at Soap Central

Passions characters
Television characters introduced in 2001
Male characters in television
Fictional characters incorrectly presumed dead